Sophie of Prussia may refer to:

 Duchess Sophie of Prussia (1582–1610)
 Sophia Louise of Mecklenburg-Schwerin (1685–1735), Queen of Prussia
 Princess Sophia Dorothea of Prussia (1719–1765)
 Sophia of Prussia (1870–1932), Queen of the Hellenes, wife of King Constantine I
 Sophie, Princess of Prussia (born 1978) wife of Georg Friedrich, Prince of Prussia

See
Sophie
Prussia